"Eviva España" (alternatively "Y Viva España") is a Belgian pop song, originally written by composer Leo Caerts and lyricist Leo Rozenstraten in Dutch. It was first recorded and performed by the Belgian singer Samantha (born Christiane Bervoets) in 1971. Musically, the song has a distinctly Spanish-sounding pasodoble style. The theme of the lyrics is anticipation of a holiday in Spain.

While Spanish-sounding, the original song title (and chorus line) "Eviva España" does not make sense in Spanish. Although "España" is the correct name of the country in Spanish, there is no such word as "Eviva". The phrase "Que viva España" translates to "Long live Spain", and is probably the meaning that the (non-Spanish-speaking) authors were aiming for. It is not known whether the misspelling was a mistake (such as confusion with the Italian exclamation evviva, also meaning "long live..."), or just intended for alliteration.

After widespread success in Dutch-speaking countries, the song was picked up by songwriters in several other European countries. As was the custom of the time, it was translated and performed by local artists for the various markets, achieving mainstream success in numerous countries between 1972 and 1977. Notable versions include the first Spanish version (performed by Hanna Ahroni and later by Manolo Escobar), the German version (performed by Hanna Ahroni), and the English version (performed by Sylvia Vrethammar as "Sylvia").

The Spanish songwriters tasked with adapting the song into Spanish, naturally found it necessary to change the "Eviva España" line. They opted to rename the song "Y Viva España", meaning "And Long Live Spain"—thereby keeping the phrasing of the chorus while having it make sense. The song was extremely successful both in the original 1972 version, and in later versions such as the 1973 version by Manolo Escobar. 

In 1974 the long standing Latin and dance orchestra Billo's Caracas Boys from Venezuela, with the voice of Guillermo "Memo" Morales and in a perfect pasodoble rhythm, became one of the most recognizable pasodobles in the whole Latin America region and especially in  Venezuela. This version is so well known and played, even today (Spain included) that it was used/played by the stadium DJ in the final match of 2010 FIFA World Cup to celebrate the triumph of Spain that year.

The song became so ubiquitous in Latin America, and especially Spain, that it is now considered part of both cultures' musical heritage.

The creators of the English version also opted for the Spanish title, rather than the original one. It also became very successful, spending six months in the UK Singles Chart and reaching the number four spot. It sold over one million copies, and was awarded a gold disc. The song has sold 130,000 copies in Belgium. There were 56 cover versions in Germany, including one by James Last; total sales were 1.5 million copies sold. The cover version by Sylvia sold 200,000 in United Kingdom.

The Swedish version, also performed by Sylvia Vrethammar, became a Svensktoppen hit for 11 weeks between 3 June and 12 August 1973, peaking at number 1.

The song was adapted for Fulham Football Club to "Viva el Fulham", performed by Tony Rees and the Cottagers, for the club's run to the 1975 FA Cup Final. This version is still sung at club matches to this date.

In Turkey, the song has been re-written and turned into "Yaşa Fenerbahçe", the official song of the Fenerbahçe S.K. football club.

Language versions

References

1971 songs
Holiday songs
Songs about Spain
Number-one singles in Spain
Football songs and chants
Sylvia Vrethammar songs
Schlager songs
Dutch-language Belgian songs